The Dymaean Wall (Teichos Dymaiōn) or Kalogria Castle is a prehistoric acropolis in western Achaea, Greece. The fortress stands in a strategic position on a rocky hilltop, north of the Prokopos lagoon, near the village of Araxos. It was built in the Mycenaean period, probably around 1300 BC, but human occupation of the site started already around 3500 BC. It was deserted in the 18th century AD. During World War II it was used by occupying Italian forces, who built a number of military installations on the site and damaged the prehistoric fortifications. 

It was named the Dymaean Wall after the nearby ancient city of Dyme. During the war between the Achaean and the Aetolian Leagues (220–217 BC) it was seized by king Philip V of Macedon.

References

Ancient Achaea
Dymi, Achaea
Neolithic Greece
Buildings and structures in Achaea